Sarai Nazar Ali is a neighborhood in Ghaziabad, Uttar Pradesh.

References

Neighbourhoods in Uttar Pradesh
Ghaziabad district, India
Caravanserais in India